The 2013–14 Western Athletic Conference men's basketball season began with practices in October 2013, which was followed by the beginning of the 2013–14 NCAA Division I men's basketball season in November. The regular season title was won by the Utah Valley Wolverines, who fell to Idaho in the first round of the conference tournament. New Mexico State was crowned the conference champions for their third straight season after a 77-55 win over the Vandals.

Following the regular season, 10 teams participated in the 2013 WAC men's basketball tournament, with the champions, New Mexico State being the only team to advance to the 2014 NCAA Men's Division I Basketball Tournament; two teams participated in the 2014 National Invitation Tournament.

Daniel Mullings of New Mexico State was named conference player of the year for the regular season, whereas the Aggies' center Sim Bhullar was named the tournament's Most Outstanding Player.

Conference games

Composite Matrix 
This table summarizes the head-to-head results between teams in conference play. (x) indicates games remaining this season.

Exhibitions

WAC tournament

References